Design Village is an outlet mall in Batu Kawan, Penang, Malaysia. Design Village is reportedly built on a 24-acre tropical garden. At the time of its opening in November 2016, the mall was nearly 70% filled with tenants. Among the tenants are Gap, Timberland, Pierre Cardin, Padini, Adidas, Body Glove, Levi's, Guess, Samsonite, Esprit and Cotton On. There are eateries within the mall such as Coffee Bean, Starbucks, Baskin-Robbins and Wendy's. A handful of health care stores also complement the wide range of international brands, including Watsons and 7-Eleven.

See also 
 List of shopping malls in Malaysia
 The Spring Kuching

References

External links
 Design Village

Outlet malls
Shopping malls in Penang
Shopping malls established in 2016
South Seberang Perai District
2016 establishments in Malaysia